ABN Barda was an Azerbaijani football club from Barda, Azerbaijan.

History
In 2007, ABN Bärdä became the 14th club in the Azerbaijani top flight following a special ruling by the AFFA. The team is being coached by Ali Guliyev for the 2008/09 season. The club currently participating in the Azerbaijan First Division.

Last squads

League and domestic cup history 

	

Football clubs in Azerbaijan
1992 establishments in Azerbaijan
Association football clubs disestablished in 2010
2010 disestablishments in Azerbaijan
Defunct football clubs in Azerbaijan